Charles Pearson Govan (born 12 January 1943) is a Northern Irish former professional footballer who played in the Football League for Mansfield Town.

References

1943 births
Living people
English footballers
Association football forwards
English Football League players
Burnley F.C. players
Mansfield Town F.C. players
Long Eaton United F.C. players